Fahri Sabit Korutürk (3 August 1903 – 12 October 1987) was a Turkish admiral, diplomat and politician who was the 6th president of Turkey from 1973 to 1980. Before his presidency, he served as the 3rd commander of the Turkish Naval Forces from 1957 to 1960. He was also a member of the Senate of the Republic from 1968 to 1973 and again in 1980. Prior to his senatorship, he served as Turkey's ambassador to the Soviet Union from 1960 to 1964.

He was born in Istanbul, at Soğukçeşme Sokağı, a small street between Topkapı Palace and Hagia Sophia. He attended the navy cadet school in 1916, was graduated in 1923 and from the Naval Academy in 1933. In 18 March 1934 after an encounter with President Atatürk he was given Korutürk as his Surname. Korutürk saw active service on cruisers and submarines and later traveled abroad as naval attaché in Rome, Berlin and Stockholm. In 1936, he participated in Montreux Convention Regarding the Regime of the Turkish Straits as military advisor. He was made rear admiral in 1950 and commanded various units until he became admiral.

After his retirement in 1960 from the post of Commander of the Turkish Navy, Korutürk was appointed by the Head of State Cemal Gürsel as Turkish ambassador to the Soviet Union (1960-1964) and later to Spain (1964-1965). In 1968, President Cevdet Sunay appointed him member of the senate. On 6 April 1973, the Grand National Assembly of Turkey elected him the 6th President of the Republic of Turkey. During his term he presided over the Turkish Invasion of Cyprus after Archbishop Makarios III was ousted by the Greek officer-led Cypriot National Guard.

Korutürk served the constitutional term of seven years until 6 April 1980. Kenan Evren said that he suggested President Korutürk to occupy the office of presidency one more term through military's intervention as he was a respected figure by both military officers and parliamentarians, but he refused this offer and stated it would be unconstitutional. Afterwards he became a senator until the coup d`etat in 1980.

He married Emel Korutürk in 1944 and they had two sons and a daughter. Fahri Korutürk died in Moda, Istanbul. He was laid to rest in the Turkish State Cemetery in Ankara.

His son Osman Korutürk was appointed Turkey's ambassador in Tehran in October 1996. The Iranian government presented him with documents about his father that had been acquired during 1979 seizure of American embassy. In the documents it's said that most ambassadors serving in Soviet Union used the black market to exchange their paychecks with American dollars (which had more value among the population) while Fahri Korutürk is the only one who used Gosbank to exchange his paycheck

Works
 İskajerak Deniz Muharebesi hakkında bir konferans (A Conference on the Battle of Skagerrak)

See also
 List of Turkish diplomats
 1973 Turkish presidential election

References

1903 births
1987 deaths
20th-century presidents of Turkey
Military personnel from Istanbul
Naval Academy (Turkey) alumni
Turkish Muslims
Commanders of the Turkish Naval Forces
Presidents of Turkey
Burials at Turkish State Cemetery
Ambassadors of Turkey to the Soviet Union
Ambassadors of Turkey to Spain
Naval attachés
Politicians from Istanbul
Turkish admirals